Lake Lomond is a lake in Clearwater County, Minnesota, in the United States.

Lake Lomond was named after Loch Lomond, in Scotland.

See also
List of lakes in Minnesota

References

Lakes of Minnesota
Lakes of Clearwater County, Minnesota